Janet Quentin Plowe was a biologist credited for helping to discover the cell membrane.

Biography
In 1931 she demonstrated that the cell membrane is physical, instead of an interface between two different liquids. Janet Plowe was born in 1905 in California.

Plowe, a student of William Seifriz, was among the pioneers of micro-injection into plant cells.

She discovered the elasticity and composition of several large organelles, and the cell membrane itself.

References 

1900s births
Year of birth uncertain
Year of death missing
20th-century American biologists
American women biologists
Stanford University alumni
University of Pennsylvania alumni
20th-century American women scientists